The Croatian Actuarial Association (CAA) is a professional association of actuaries in Croatia, promoting and developing actuary science and profession in theory and practice, facilitating members' professional development and knowledge sharing.

CAA has been established in 1996. with membership count of 131 regular, 42 affiliates and 2 honorary members.

CAA is a member of International Actuarial Association (IAA) and Actuarial Association of Europe (AAE).

External links

 Croatian Actuarial Association official website
 International Actuarial Association (IAA)
 Actuarial Association of Europe (AAE) 

Actuarial associations
Professional associations based in Croatia
1996 establishments in Croatia
Organizations established in 1996